The palmar carpal arch is a joining of an artery to an artery, a circulatory anastomosis, known as an arterio-arterial anastomosis. The two connected arteries are the palmar carpal branch of the radial artery and the palmar carpal branch of the ulnar artery.

This anastomosis is joined by a branch from the anterior interosseous artery above, and by recurrent branches from the deep palmar arch below, thus forming a palmar carpal network which supplies the articulations of the wrist and carpus.

See also
 Dorsal carpal arch
 Deep palmar arch
 Superficial palmar arch

References

Arteries of the upper limb